is a former Japanese football player.

Playing career
Honda was born in Osaka Prefecture on November 20, 1973. After graduating from Kindai University, he joined the newly promoted J1 League club, Kyoto Purple Sanga in 1996. He played many matches as defensive midfielder during the first season. However he did not play in any matches in 1998 and retired at the end of the 1999 season.

Club statistics

References

External links

kyotosangadc

1973 births
Living people
Kindai University alumni
Association football people from Osaka Prefecture
Japanese footballers
J1 League players
Kyoto Sanga FC players
Association football midfielders